This list details notable events occurring in 2017 in Germany. Major events included the death of Helmut Kohl and the legalization of same-sex marriage.

Incumbents
 President:
Joachim Gauck (until 18 March 2017)
Frank-Walter Steinmeier (from 18 March 2017)
 Chancellor: Angela Merkel

Events

January
 January – 2016–2017 Tour de Ski
 January – 2016–2017 Biathlon World Cup – World Cup 4
 January – 2016–2017 Biathlon World Cup – World Cup 5
 11 January – Elbphilharmonie in Hamburg opened.
 20 January – Museum Barberini in Potsdam opened.

February
 1–5 February – 2017 German Masters
 9–18 February – 67th Berlin International Film Festival
 9 February – Germany in the Eurovision Song Contest 2017
 12 February – 2017 German presidential election

March
 CeBIT in Hanover
 ITB Berlin in Berlin
 Leipzig Book Fair in Leipzig
 Germany in the Eurovision Song Contest 2017
 In March 2017, French company Groupe PSA agreed to buy German company Opel and its English sister brand Vauxhall and their European auto lending business from General Motors for US$2.2 billion,
 9 March – 2017 Düsseldorf axe attack
 26 March – 2017 Saarland state election

April
 Hanover Messe in Hanover
 Deutscher Filmpreis in Berlin
 7 April – Opening of Internationale Gartenausstellung 2017

May
 7 May – 2017 Schleswig-Holstein state election
 14 May – 2017 Nordrhein-Westfalen state election
 29 May – 5 June – 2017 World Table Tennis Championships

June
 Kiel Week in Kiel
 Rosenhang Museum in Weilburg opened.
 10 June – September Documenta 14
 Merger of German company The Linde Group and Praxair.
 27 June – Armin Laschet become Minister-president of North Rhine-Westphalia.
 28 June – Daniel Günther become Minister-president of Schleswig-Holstein.
 30 June – The Bundestag voted to make same-sex marriage legal.

July
 4 July – Manuela Schwesig become Minister-president of Mecklenburg-Vorpommern.
 6 July - The Transparency in Wage Structures Act goes into effect.
 7–8 July – 2017 G20 Hamburg summit
 28 July – 2017 Hamburg attack
 30 July – Konstanz shooting

August
 Hanse Sail in Rostock
 Internationale Funkausstellung Berlin in Berlin
 15 August – Air Berlin files for bankruptcy.
 18 August – Bain Capital and Cinven acquired German company Stada Arzneimittel.

September  
 24 September – 2017 German federal election
 ILA Berlin Air Show in Berlin
 Gamescom in Cologne
 Frankfurt Motor Show in Frankfurt
 September – October – Oktoberfest in Munich

October 
 Frankfurt Book Fair in Frankfurt
 15 October – 2017 Lower Saxony state election

December 
 1 December – 2017 World Women's Handball Championship
 December – German company Hamburg Süd is sold to Danish company Maersk.

Deaths

January 

 4 January:  Heinz Billing, German physicist and computer scientist (b. 1914).
 10 January: Roman Herzog, German politician, former president (born 1934)
 13 January: Udo Ulfkotte, German journalist and political scientist (born 1960)
 14 January: Herbert Mies, German politician (born 1929)
 16 January: Franz Jarnach, German actor and musician. (born 1943)
 20 January: Klaus Huhn, German journalist, writer and sports administrator (born 1928)
 26 January: Michael Tönnies, German football player (born 1959)
 27 January: Brunhilde Pomsel, German broadcaster and secretary to Joseph Goebbels (b. 1911).

February 
 6 February: Inge Keller, German actress (born 1923)
 15 February: Manfred Kaiser, German footballer (born 1929)

March 
 12 March: Horst Ehmke, German politician (born 1927)
 23 March: Ingeborg Rapoport, German paediatrician (b. 1912)
 28 March: Christine Kaufmann, German actress (born 1945)

April 

 9 April: Dieter Kottysch, German boxer (born 1943)
 11 April: Michael Ballhaus, German cinematographer (born 1935)

May 
 2 May: Heinz Kessler, German politician, military officer and a convicted felon (born 1920)
 15 May: Karl-Otto Apel, German philosopher (born 1922)
 16 May: Gunnar Möller, German actor (born 1928)
 20 May: Paul Falk, Germann pair skater (born 1921)

June 

 1 June: Tankred Dorst, German playwright and storyteller (born 1925)
 11 June: Alexandra Kluge, German actress and physician (born 1937)
 16 June: Helmut Kohl, German politician, former chancellor (born 1930)
 22 June: Gunter Gabriel, Germann singer, musician and composer (born 1942)

July 
 10 July: Peter Härtling, German writer, poet, publisher and journalist. (born 1933)
 20 July: Andrea Jürgens German singer (born 1967)
 22 July: Fritz Hellwig, German politician (born 1912)
 26 July: Constantin Heereman von Zuydtwyck, German politician (born 1931)

August 

 5 August: Martin Roth, German museum director (born 1955)
 10 August: Ruth Pfau, German physician and nun (born 1929)
 15 August: Eberhard Jäckel, German historian (born 1929)
 19 August: Karl Otto Götz, German painter (b. 1914)
 20 August: Margot Hielscher, German actress and singer (born 1919)
 20 August: Wilhelm Killmayer, German composer of classical music, a conductor and an academic teacher (born 1927)

September 

 8 September: Karl Ravens, German politician (born 1927)
 12 September: Heiner Geißler, German politician (born 1930)
 15 September: Albert Speer Jr., German architect (born 1934)
 27 September: Joy Fleming, German singer (born 1944)
 28 September: Andreas Schmidt, German actor (born 1963)

October 
 7 October: Hugo Budinger, German field hockey player (born 1927) 
 11 October: Karl-Heinz Kipp, German entrepreneur (born 1924)

November 

 5 November: Lothar Thoms, German track cyclist (born 1956)
 6 November: Karin Dor, German actress (born 1938)
 7 November: Hans-Michael Rehberg, German actor (born 1938)
 7 November: Hans Schäfer, German footballer (born 1927)
 20 November: Dieter Bellmann, German actor (born 1940)
 21 November: Peter Berling, German actor (born 1934)

December 
 3 December: Elmar Faber, German book publisher (born 1934)
 25 December: Erich Kellerhals, German businessman (born 1939)
 30 December: Bernd Spier, German singer (born 1944)

See also 
 2017 in German television

References 

 
Germany
Germany
2010s in Germany
Years of the 21st century in Germany